The 2016 Continental Tire SportsCar Challenge was the seventeenth season of the Continental Tire SportsCar Challenge and the third season organized by the International Motor Sports Association (IMSA).

Classes
The class structure remained unchanged from 2015.

Grand Sport (GS)
Street Tuner (ST)

Schedule

The 2016 schedule was released on August 8, 2015 and features ten rounds. Every race will be 2 hours and 30 minutes in length and will feature both the GS and ST classes. All races will be televised by FOX Sports on a tape-delayed basis and streamed live on IMSA TV. There was also a test session before the beginning of the season: The Roar Before the 24 at Daytona from January 8 to January 10.

Entry list

Grand Sport

Street Tuner

Race results
Bold indicates overall winner.

Championship standings

Points system

Championship points are awarded in each class at the finish of each event. Points are awarded based on finishing positions as shown in the chart below.

Drivers' Championships

Grand Sport

Notes
Drivers denoted by † did not complete sufficient laps in order to score points.

Street Tuner

Notes
1 – Remo Ruscitti was not able to score points as he exceeded the maximum drive-time limitation.
Drivers denoted by † did not complete sufficient laps in order to score points.

Teams' Championships

Grand Sport

Street Tuner

Notes
1 – #18 RS1 was not able to score points as driver Remo Ruscitti exceeded the maximum drive-time limitation.
2 – #75 C360R was not able to score points as driver Tom Dyer exceeded the maximum drive-time limitation.

Manufacturers' Championships

Grand Sport

Street Tuner

See also
2016 WeatherTech SportsCar Championship

References

External links

2016
2016 in American motorsport